Nathan Morley (born 14 January 1974) is an investigative journalist, television news anchor, and newspaper columnist based in Finland and Cyprus.

He is best known to international audiences for his live radio broadcasts on Talksport, LBC and the BBC to the United Kingdom. He is also a familiar voice to worldwide listeners for his CBS and Voice of America reports.

Eurovision Song Contest

A high-profile TV and media campaign announced he had been appointed the English language Eurovision Song Contest 2009 radio commentator for the Cypriot state broadcaster, CyBC. The commentary in English marked a first for a non-English language EBU member. He also hosted national radio commentary the 2010, 2011 and 2012 Eurovision Song Contest.

Broadcasting
His recent notable interviews include former US President Jimmy Carter, Archbishop Desmond Tutu, Greek Prime Minister George Papandreou, Tassos Papadopoulos, Glafkos Klerides, George Vassiliou, Terry Waite, Sir David Hannay, Rafik Hariri, Mehmet Ali Talat, Bülent Ecevit, Álvaro de Soto, Ingrid Betancourt and Rauf Denktaş. He took leave from daily radio in 2003 and was based in the Middle East where he collaborated with such notables as the late Tareq Ayyoub who was killed by US gunfire, during the Iraq War of 2003.

A vast library of his interviews are housed at the British Library Sound Archive in London.

Television and Radio
Morley is a national radio and television presenter with Cyprus Broadcasting Corporation (PIK/CyBC), where he presents the Weekend Evening News on television and a weekday radio programme on CyBC Radio 2 called 'Round and About' which includes news interviews, interspersed with music and comments from listeners.

His weekly nostalgia programme Nicosia Calling on Radio 2 features the greatest songs and performances from Hollywood, Broadway and Tin Pan Alley and includes live weekly interviews with notables including Andy Williams, Vera Lynn, Martha Reeves, Cleo Laine, Max Bygraves and other entertainers from the last century.

He is the only LBC radio personality to have maintained a weekly uninterrupted live feature, which has broadcast continuously over 10 years at 5.30 on Thursday mornings, making it the longest running live slot since the station's launch in 1973.

In addition to domestic television, he reports for the international German TV and radio network Deutsche Welle (DWTV).

He is one of the main presenters on Home and Travel TV on Sky Digital in the United Kingdom, where he hosts several travel related programmes and chat shows.

Morley is the Cyprus correspondent for the Voice of America, Vatican Radio and ORF Radio Austria (Radioprogramme des Österreichischen Rundfunks).

During the 2003 US invasion of Iraq he was a presenter with the USA Radio Network (reporting from the Iraqi border), co-hosting and reporting for all of the networks news programs. The USA Radio Network coverage won a prestigious Katie Award in 2004, and Morley anchored several US national news shows which were transmitted live across the USA.

He has also been heard reporting for the network radio division of CBS News from Jordan, Turkey, Lebanon and Israel.

Morley has been a regular voice on LBC radio in London since 2001, where he joins Steve Allen on Thursday mornings; he also reports for other LBC programmes. In late 2006 he joined Talksport as a reporter on the night time show with Ian Collins.

During the mid-1990s he was regular voice on Chris Tarrant's Capital FM breakfast news filing stories from Cyprus and the Middle East.

He broadcasts a weekly segment on BBC Radio Berkshire called Euro News, from the BBC studios in Cyprus, with Phil Kennedy.

Family
Morley is the son-in law of the former Finland national team star goal keeper Lars Nasman and grandson of Grimsby Town supporters' club chairman Bernard Morley.

Awards
Morley was awarded the New York Festival's Silver World Medal award for broadcasting in 2001 at a ceremony in Manhattan in New York. He was presented with the gong by broadcaster Cousin Brucie from WABC. He also won the IPAR award in Italy for his presentation of The World This Week in 2005.

Newspapers

Morley is a feature writer and journalist at the leading English language daily Cyprus Mail newspaper. He writes a weekly column for the Cyprus Observer newspaper. He is an occasional writer for the Daily Express in the United Kingdom. He also writes for the Brussels-based political newspaper New Europe.

Trivia

 He is the long – running American voiced daily compere on the Nick Ferrari breakfast show on LBC Radio in London.
He was a trainee with BFBS, the British Forces Broadcasting Service in Germany in 1989.
As a teenager he spent time as a presenter on the Voice of Peace radio station in Israel, where he presented Twilight Time and The Classical Music Programme.

External links

 Official twitter account
 Nathan Morley- New Europe
 Morley to do Eurovision – Cyprus Mail
 LBC 97.3
 Sky TV Home & Travel Channel Biography
 CyBC Eurovision clip from YouTube
 Cyprus Broadcasting Corporation
 VOA Report
 Radio Journal Deutschland 1999 feature
 Uri Geller stunt
 ABC Australia 2002 report
 BBC Newsround 2002 report 
 USA Radio Network

1974 births
Living people
People from Grimsby
English radio presenters
English columnists
Offshore radio broadcasters
BBC people
CBS people
Voice of America people